Ardglass Football Club was a Northern Irish junior-level football club playing in the Newcastle & District League.  The club hails from Ardglass, County Down, Northern Ireland and was founded in 1973, when it joined the Newcastle & District League before being admitted to the Northern Amateur Football League in 1992. After being relegated from the Premier Division in 2017 the club announced their withdrawal from the Amateur League, citing a lack of players for the decision. The club played in the Irish Cup.

External links
 nifootball.co.uk - (For fixtures, results and tables of all Northern Ireland amateur football leagues)

Notes

Association football clubs established in 1973
Association football clubs disestablished in 2017
Association football clubs in County Down
Northern Amateur Football League clubs
Ardglass
1973 establishments in Northern Ireland
2017 disestablishments in Northern Ireland
Defunct association football clubs in Northern Ireland